Katsoburi Managed Reserve  is a protected area in Abasha Municipality of Samegrelo-Zemo Svaneti in the historical region of Colchis lowlands in western Georgia.

Katsoburi Managed Reserve  is part of Georgia's Protected Areas which also includes located nearby Kolkheti National Park.

Korugi Managed Reserve is located on right bank of Rioni river where it takes water from  tributary — Megruli Skurda River.  Katsoburi Managed Reserve was established in order to protect floodplain forest.

Geography  
Reserve covers territory of flat floodplain with maximum height 40 m above sea level.
River Rioni flows into the territory of Katsoburi Managed Reserve. 
Soil types are limited primarily to alluvial claysands and some humus claysand soils in small areas. 
Hydrography  of Katsoburi Managed Reserve is rather complex. It includes Rioni river with tributary — Megruli Skurda River and Narionali Lake. Groundwater comes very close to the earth surface and create marshes.

Climate 
Mean annual minimum temperature of January is -4 °C, and annual maximum temperature is +22 °C. Annual total precipitation - 17757 mm.

Flora 
Relict Euxine-Colchic deciduous forests did not survive in this area.  Forest mainly consists of alder groves, with wing nut (Pterocarya pterocarpa), ash tree (Fraxinus excelsior) and also  Mimosa (Acacia dealbata), alder tree (Alnus barbata), Goat willow (Salix caprea), pear (Pyrus caucasica), wild plum (Prunus divaricata), oleaster (Elaeagnus angustifolia) and Indigo bush (Amorpha fruticosa).

Fauna 
Mammals include the wild boar and roe deer, wolf, jackal, European badger, European wildcat, Eurasian otter and the European hare.

Several species of birds can be found in the reserve, including: woodpigeon, grey heron, common chaffinch, mallard, ferruginous duck, Eurasian sparrowhawk, northern goshawk as well as a population of common pheasant.

See also
Rioni River
Kolkheti National Park

References 

Managed reserves of Georgia (country)
Protected areas established in 1996
Geography of Samegrelo-Zemo Svaneti
Floodplains of Europe